Ŕ (minuscule: ŕ) is a letter of the Lower Sorbian and Slovak alphabets, Ukrainian Latin alphabet and Proto-Turkic orthography. It is formed from R with the addition of an acute.

Slovak
In Slovak  is used to represent , the geminate syllabic alveolar trill.

Lower Sorbian
It is used in Lower Sorbian to represent , the palatalised alveolar trill.

Basque

See also
 Ř
 Rz (digraph)

References

Latin letters with diacritics
Polish letters with diacritics